Chekhov is a rural locality (a selo) in Kholmsky District of Sakhalin Oblast, Russia, located at the Strait of Tartary.  Population:

History
After the Soviet Union took control of the whole of Sakhalin island after World War II, it was granted town status and renamed Chekhov (after the Russian writer Anton Chekhov) in 1947. It was demoted in status to that of a rural locality in 2004.

References

Rural localities in Sakhalin Oblast
Defunct towns in Russia